A muscular artery (or distributing artery) is a medium-sized artery that draws blood from an elastic artery and branches into "resistance vessels" including small arteries and arterioles. Their walls contain larger number of smooth muscles, allowing them to contract and expand depending on peripheral blood demand. 

This contrasts to the mechanism of elastic arteries, which use their elastic properties to store the energy generated by the heart's contraction for a brief moment (elastic recoil).

Under the microscope, muscular arteries can be identified by their clearly defined internal elastic lamina. In constricted vessels, the elastic lamina of muscular arteries appears thick and kinky. The elastic lamina is best visualized using Verhoeff's stain, but can be easily detected in specimens stained using other techniques as a well-defined negative staining region.

Examples of muscular arteries include the radial artery, femoral artery and the splenic artery.

Muscular arteries, along with elastic arteries, are common sites for atherosclerosis.

References
‌

Norrander, J.M., Kirkpatrick C., Bauer, G.E., Porter, M.E., Marker, P.C., Linck, R.W., et al. (2008).  Human Histology 2008. University of Minnesota - Twin Cities. Human Histology (GCD 6103/8103) Fall 2008 Course Packet. 

Arteries